Defne Ayas (born 1976) is a curator, educator, and publisher in the field of contemporary art and its institutions. Ayas  directed and advised many institutions and collaborative platforms across the world, including in China, South Korea, United States, Netherlands, Russia, Lithuania and Italy. She is known for conceiving exhibition and biennale formats within diverse geographies, in each instance composing interdisciplinary frameworks that provide historical anchoring and engagement with local conditions. Until June 2021, Ayas was the Artistic Director of 2021 Gwangju Biennale, together with Natasha Ginwala.

She was the director of the Witte de With Center for Contemporary Art in Rotterdam (2012-2017). Towards the end of her tenure in 2017, she announced that the institution had to change its name to dissociate itself from its namesake, the Dutch naval officer Witte Corneliszoon de With. The institution’s decision to change its name was immediately politicized, causing a flurry of controversy in the Netherlands. The decision for a name change was triggered by an Open Letter to Witte de With published on 14 June 2017 by Egbert Alejandro Martina, Ramona Sno, Hodan Warsame, Patricia Schor, Amal Alhaag, and Maria Guggenbichler, and the debates that followed.

Career 
As announced by the Gwangju Biennale Foundation, Defne Ayas together with Natasha Ginwala served as the Artistic Directors of the 13th edition of the Gwangju Biennale, in 2020. The curatorial duo announced their plans around the exhibition concept around Minds Rising, Spirits Tuning, that laid emphasis on the dialectical space between communal and artificial intelligence shaped  by feminist, queer and indigenous knowledge. The exhibition had to be postponed due to Covid19 pandemic to April 2021.

At Witte de With (2012-2017), Ayas oversaw a diverse exhibition and publication program devoted to established and emerging visual artists, writers, and filmmakers from across the globe. With her tenure starting, she commissioned and curated long-term research projects, solo and group exhibitions and ambitious live performance programs, including Kunsthalle for Music by Ari Benjamin Meyers (2017-2018), The Music of Ramon Raquello and his Orchestra by Eric Baudelaire (2017), Öğüt & Macuga by Ahmet Öğüt and Goshka Macuga (2017), The Ten Murders of Josephine by Rana Hamadeh (2017),  As If It Were by Bik Van der Pol(2016), Relational Stalinism -The Musical by Michael Portnoy (2016), three-part Art in the Age of…series (with focus on energy and raw materials, asymmetric warfare and planetary computation) (2015), Bit Rot by Douglas Coupland (2015), Character is Fate by Willem de Rooij (2015), Moderation(s) by artist Heman Chong (with Spring, Hong Kong, 2012-2014); Dai Hanzhi: 5000 Artists (with UCCA, Beijing, 2014); The Humans – a theatrical play by writer and artist Alexandre Singh – and its monthly summits Causeries  (2012-2013); the open archive and collection Tulkus 1880 to 2018 by artist Paola Pivi (with Castello di Rivoli and Arthub Asia, 2013-2018), Blueprints by Qiu Zhijie (2012) as well as the award-winning exhibition The Temptation of AA Bronson (2013).

Ayas worked on a number of biennial projects such as: Artistic Director of 2020 Gwangju Biennale, together with Natasha Ginwala, curator of the Pavilion of Turkey  in the 56th International Art Exhibition, Venice Biennale; co-curator the 6th Moscow Biennale ACTING IN A CENTER IN A CITY IN THE HEART OF THE ISLAND OF EURASIA (with Nicolaus Schafhausen and Bart de Baere); curator of the 11th Baltic Triennale  (with Benjamin Cook, LUX, in collaboration with artists Ieva Misevičiūtė and Michael Portnoy ); co-curator of the Istanbul and Bandung city pavilions as part of the Intercity Project of the 9th Shanghai Biennale.  Ayas also served as a curatorial advisor to the 8th Shanghai Biennale (China), and as a publication advisor to the 8th Gwangju Biennale (South Korea) in 2010.

Ayas has been a curator of Performa, the biennial of visual art performance of New York founded by RoseLee Goldberg, since its inception in 2005. At Performa, Ayas organised numerous projects and programs with an international roster of acclaimed artists, architects, and writers; while overseeing biennial’s architecture, writing and print programs and its consortium relations.  She remains a Curator-at-Large (as of 2012).

Ayas also co-founded several independent initiatives, including Arthub Asia – an Asia-wide active research and production initiative (with Davide Quadrio) (2007), producing exhibitions and live productions including operas and performances, within the context of China and rest of Asia. Prior to joining Arthub Asia and Performa, she worked as the Public Programs Coordinator of New Museum of Contemporary Art, New York, especially artists presentations and critical debates relating to contemporary art and new media. (2003-2005)

Ayas is the founding co-curator (with late Neery Melkonian) of Blind Dates Project – an artistic platform that is dedicated to tackling what remains of the peoples, places and cultures of the Ottoman Empire (1299-1923).

She served on many juries including 2019 Venice Biennale International Jury, Prince Claus Awards, and The Eliasson Global Leadership Prize of the Tällberg Foundation. Ayas is currently a board member of Stedelijk Museum Amsterdam, the Rijksakademie (Amsterdam); Tällberg Foundation; The New Centre for Research & Practice, Collectorspace (Istanbul), Sabanci Museum (Istanbul), and Protocinema (Istanbul); and was also a curator at large of Spring Workshop (Hong Kong). (2013-2017)

Publications 
Ayas launched Witte de With’s new online platform WdWReview in 2013, with global editorial desks in Moscow, Istanbul, Delhi/Calcutta, Shanghai, Cairo, and Athens.  She is currently, together with writer and curator Adam Kleinman, the Chief Editor of the journal.

She is publisher, editor and contributor to a number of books including:
 Stronger Than Bone(2021) by Defne Ayas, Natasha Ginwala and Jill Winder
 Minds Rising, Spirits Tuning(2021) by Defne Ayas and Natasha Ginwala
  Blessing and Transgressing: A Live Institute (2018) by Defne Ayas 
 Wdw Review Vol.1.1: Arts, Culture, and Journalism in Revolt  (2017) by Defne Ayas and Adam Kleinman
 Wdw Review Vol.1: Arts, Culture, and Journalism in Revolt (2017) by Defne Ayas and Adam Kleinman
 How to Gather: Acting Relations, Mapping Positions (2017) by Defne Ayas and Bart De Baere
 Were It As If (2017) by Defne Ayas and Bik Van Der Pol
 Causeries (2016) by Alexandre Singh 
 Unicorns in a Blueprint (2016) by Qiu Zhijie 
 Art in the Age of... (2015) 
 Bit Rot (2015) by Douglas Coupland
 Character Is Fate (2015) Piet Mondrian’s Horoscope (Willem de Rooij)
 Respiro by Sarkis (2015)
 End Note(s): Moderation(s) 2012-2014 (2015)
 Erik van Lieshout: Home South (2015)
 Performa 13 (2015)
 The Crime Was Almost Perfect (2014)
 Performa 11: Staging Ideas (2013)
 Performa 09: (2011)
 The Making of Meeting (2013)
 Füsun Onur (2013)
 Performa (2007)

In addition, Ayas has published in art magazines and journals such as Mousse, Yishu Journal, and Creative Time Reports.

Education 
Ayas holds a B.A. in Foreign Affairs at University of Virginia and MPS from the Interactive Telecommunications Program New York University. Ayas also completed De Appel Curatorial Programme in Amsterdam in 2005.

References

External links
 Witte de With Center for Contemporary Art

1976 births
Living people
Writers from Istanbul
University of Virginia alumni
Tisch School of the Arts alumni
Arts administrators
Women arts administrators
Place of birth missing (living people)
Turkish emigrants to the United States
Turkish curators
Turkish women curators
Turkish women writers